The counties of Uganda are divided into sub-counties, which are further divided into parishes and villages. The head elected official in a district is the Chairperson of the Local Council V.

See also
 Regions of Uganda
 Districts of Uganda
 Counties of Uganda
 Parishes of Uganda
 Uganda Local Governments Association

References

Subdivisions of Uganda
Uganda 3
Subcounties, Uganda